Christos Kourtellas (born 9 August 1974) is a Cypriot sports shooter. He competed in the men's skeet event at the 1996 Summer Olympics.

References

1974 births
Living people
Cypriot male sport shooters
Olympic shooters of Cyprus
Shooters at the 1996 Summer Olympics
Sportspeople from Nicosia
Commonwealth Games medallists in shooting
Commonwealth Games gold medallists for Cyprus
Commonwealth Games silver medallists for Cyprus
Shooters at the 1994 Commonwealth Games
Shooters at the 2002 Commonwealth Games
Medallists at the 1994 Commonwealth Games
Medallists at the 2002 Commonwealth Games